Selenophaedusa is a genus of terrestrial gastropods belonging to the family Clausiliidae.

Species
 Selenophaedusa bavayi (H. Nordsieck, 2002)
 Selenophaedusa billeti (H. Fischer, 1898)
 Selenophaedusa callistoma (Bavay & Dautzenberg, 1899)
 Selenophaedusa callistomella (Bavay & Dautzenberg, 1900)
 Selenophaedusa castanea (H. Nordsieck, 2012)
 Selenophaedusa cazioti (Bavay & Dautzenberg, 1909)
 Selenophaedusa chiemhoaensis (Sykes, 1902)
 Selenophaedusa dentifera Hunyadi & Szekeres, 2016
 Selenophaedusa diplochilus (Möllendorff, 1901)
 Selenophaedusa falcifera (Bavay & Dautzenberg, 1899)
 Selenophaedusa jimenezi Grego & Szekeres, 2017
 Selenophaedusa lantenoisi (Dautzenberg & H. Fischer, 1906)
 Selenophaedusa lavillei (Dautzenberg & H. Fischer, 1906)
 Selenophaedusa media (H. Nordsieck, 2005)
 Selenophaedusa ophthalmophana (Mabille, 1887)
 Selenophaedusa polydonella (H. Nordsieck, 2005)
 Selenophaedusa porphyrostoma (Bavay & Dautzenberg, 1909)
 Selenophaedusa princeps (H. Nordsieck, 2012)
 Selenophaedusa spinifera (H. Nordsieck, 2005)
 Selenophaedusa thatkheana (Bavay & Dautzenberg, 1899)

References

 Lindholm, W. A. (1924). A revised systematic list of the genera of the Clausiliidae, recent and fossil, with their subdivisions, synonymy, and types. Proceedings of the Malacological Society of London. 16 (1): 53‑64

External links
 

 

Clausiliidae